Ellatrivia merces is a species of small sea snail, a marine gastropod mollusc in the family Triviidae, the trivias.

Distribution
This marine species is endemic to Australia and occurs in the Tasman Sea.

References

 Mestayer, M. K. (1927). Some New Zealand molluscs (new and renamed species). Proceedings of the Malacological Society of London 17: 185–190.
 Powell A. W. B., New Zealand Mollusca, William Collins Publishers Ltd, Auckland, New Zealand 1979 
 Glen Pownall, New Zealand Shells and Shellfish, Seven Seas Publishing Pty Ltd, Wellington, New Zealand 1979 
 Maxwell, P.A. (2009). Cenozoic Mollusca. Pp 232-254 in Gordon, D.P. (ed.) New Zealand inventory of biodiversity. Volume one. Kingdom Animalia: Radiata, Lophotrochozoa, Deuterostomia. Canterbury University Press, Christchurch.
 Fehse D. (2002) Beiträge zur Kenntnis der Triviidae (Mollusca: Gastropoda) V. Kritische Beurteilung der Genera und Beschreibung einer neuen Art der Gattung Semitrivia Cossmann, 1903. Acta Conchyliorum 6: 3-48. page(s): 25
 Fehse D. & Grego J. (2010) Contributions to the knowledge of the Triviidae. XVI. Revision of the genus Ellatrivia Iredale, 1931 with the description of a new species (Mollusca: Gastropoda). Visaya 3(1):21-61

External links
  Lamarck, [J.-B. M. de. (1822). Histoire naturelle des animaux sans vertèbres. Tome septième. Paris: published by the Author, 711 pp.]
 Finlay H.J. (1926). A further commentary on New Zealand molluscan systematics. Transactions of the New Zealand Institute. 57: 320-485, pls 18-23

Triviidae
Gastropods of Australia
Gastropods of New Zealand
Fauna of Western Australia
Gastropods described in 1924